Deh Now is a village in Balkh Province in northern Afghanistan.

See also 
Balkh Province

References 

Populated places in Balkh Province